Stefan Nielsen may refer to:
Stefan Nielsen (handball) (born 1986), Danish handballer
Stefan Nielsen (speedway rider) (born 1994), British speedway rider
Stefan Nielsen, Danish musician, member of Rollo & King

See also
Stefan Nilsson (disambiguation)